Peter Liljedahl (born February 18, 1967) is a Swedish sprint canoer who competed in the early 1990s. At the 1992 Summer Olympics in Barcelona, he was eliminated in the semifinals of the C-1 500 m event while being disqualified in the semifinals of the C-1 1000 m event.

He is currently a Professor, Faculty of Education at Simon Fraser University, Vancouver, Canada.

References
Sports-Reference.com profile
Associate Professor, Faculty of Education, and Associate Dean of Graduate Studies, Simon Fraser University, Vancouver, BC

1967 births
Canoeists at the 1992 Summer Olympics
Living people
Olympic canoeists of Sweden
Swedish male canoeists